Joe Driscoll (born April 12, 1979 in Syracuse, New York, United States) is a rapper/musician/beatboxer and politician who uses different styles and instruments while performing. Joe currently serves as a District Councilor on the Common Council in Syracuse, New York.

Career
Driscoll was born in Syracuse, New York. He performs solo, and uses recorded loops of his own beatboxing, and live looping using a sampler to fuse hip-hop, reggae, soul, folk and roots rock. He began performing as a solo folk artist around the age of 14, and became a full-time musician in his early 20s. His first real band was "The Groove Merchants" and his first album was "Straight Butta Hits." Although the band was more of a high school band in nature, they took a lot of influence from The Dave Matthews Band and Bob Marley. They also sampled from The Rolling Stones along with many other artists during their live performances.

Driscoll was signed by 3rdegree Ltd while touring the United Kingdom in 2004. He was then signed up to London label Buttercuts Records and subsequently went on to record the album Origin Myths.  Origin Myths combines beatbox drums (oral percussion) with layers of guitar, mbira, bass, verse, and rhyme, which means that he is often described as a "one man band".

During 2007 and 2008, Driscoll has toured with Dirty Pretty Things, Regina Spektor, Coldcut, and The Sugar Hill Gang at events in the US and Europe. He has performed at UK festivals including Big Chill, Bestival and Glastonbury Festival, and at the Lake of Stars Festival (Malawi, Africa). He received an INDY Award for Best Solo Act in 2007.

His newest album, 'Mixtape Champs' was released on 20 December 2010.

Discography
Faya (together with Sekou Kouyate)
Mixtape Champs (2010)
Origin Myths (2006) Buttercuts (CD + DVD)
Life as a Monkey (2006)
Little Beat Big (2003)

References

Bondi, John D. "The Groove Merchants"

External links
Official Site
Interview at britishhiphop.co.uk, June 2008
Moron, Rosa "Joe Driscoll (interview)", Big City Redneck
GigJunkie Official Page - Videos, Reviews & Fans

Living people
American hip hop musicians
Musicians from Syracuse, New York
American expatriates in England
American beatboxers
1979 births
21st-century American singers
Politicians from Syracuse, New York
Democratic Party (United States) politicians